Franco Gastón Romero Ponte (born 11 February 1995) is a Uruguayan footballer who plays as a defender for Swiss club Bellinzona.

Club career

Volos
On 4 July 2021, Greek Super League side Volos announced him as their new transfer.

Bellinzona
On 27 August 2022, Romero joined Bellinzona in Switzerland.

References

External links
Franco Romero at playmakerstats.com (English version of ceroacero.es)

1995 births
Footballers from Montevideo
Living people
Uruguayan footballers
Association football defenders
Racing Club de Montevideo players
Liverpool F.C. (Montevideo) players
Volos N.F.C. players
AC Bellinzona players
Uruguayan Primera División players
Super League Greece players
Swiss Challenge League players
Uruguayan expatriate footballers
Expatriate footballers in Greece
Uruguayan expatriate sportspeople in Greece
Expatriate footballers in Switzerland
Uruguayan expatriate sportspeople in Switzerland